Apoteri Airport  is an airport serving the village of Apoteri, in the Upper Takutu-Upper Essequibo Region of Guyana.

See also

 List of airports in Guyana
 Transport in Guyana

References

External links
Bing Maps - Apoteri
OpenStreetMap - Apoteri
OurAirports - Apoteri
SkyVector Aeronautical Charts

Airports in Guyana